The Men's Keirin is one of the 10 men's events at the 2010 UCI Track Cycling World Championships, held in  Ballerup, Denmark  on 25 March 2010.

27 Cyclists from 16 countries participated in the contest. After the 4 qualifying heats, the fastest 2 riders in each heat advance to the second round. The remaining ones face a first round repechage

The riders that did not advance to the second round race in 4 repechage heats. The first rider in each heat advance to the second round along with the 8 that qualified before.

The first 3 riders from each of the 2 Second Round heats advance to the Final and the remaining will race a consolation 7–12 final.

Results

First round

First round repechage

Second round

Final 7-12 places

Final

References

First Round Results
First Round Repechage Results
Second Round Results
Finals Results

Men's keirin
UCI Track Cycling World Championships – Men's keirin